The Portland LumberJax are a lacrosse team based in Portland, Oregon playing in the National Lacrosse League (NLL). The 2009 season will be the 4th in franchise history.

Regular season

Conference standings

Game log
Reference:

Playoffs

Game log
Reference:

Player stats
Reference:

Runners (Top 10)

Note: GP = Games played; G = Goals; A = Assists; Pts = Points; LB = Loose balls; PIM = Penalty minutes

Goaltenders
Note: GP = Games played; MIN = Minutes; W = Wins; L = Losses; GA = Goals against; Sv% = Save percentage; GAA = Goals against average

Transactions

New players
 Matt Brown - acquired in trade
 Luke Forget - acquired in trade
 Jamison Koesterer - acquired in trade
 Brad MacDonald - acquired in trade
 Dan Stroup - signed as free agent

Players not returning
 Dan Dawson - lost in Arizona dispersal draft
 Dallas Eliuk - retired
 Matt Holman - traded
 Spencer Martin - traded
 Scott Stapleford - released

Trades

Entry draft
The 2008 NLL Entry Draft took place on September 7, 2008. The LumberJax selected the following players:

Roster

See also
2009 NLL season

References

Portland
2009 in sports in Oregon